Poker After Dark is an hour-long poker television program that originally aired on NBC, premiering on January 1, 2007. The series was canceled on December 3, 2011, following the "Black Friday" criminal case, which involved major sponsor Full Tilt Poker as one of the defendants. The show rebooted on August 14, 2017, with appearances from Tom Dwan, Daniel Negreanu, Antonio Esfandiari. Poker After Dark episodes are now filmed exclusively at the PokerGO Studio at ARIA Resort and Casino, and distributed on video streaming service PokerGO.

For its first two seasons, both of which originally aired in 2007, the show was presented by Shana Hiatt. The host for season 3 was Marianela Pereyra, and Leeann Tweeden took over starting with season 4. When the series returned on PokerGO in 2017, Drea Renee took over as lead presenter. Veronica Brill was introduced as the sideline reporter during season 12.

All seasons have contained voice-over commentary by Oliver "Ali" Nejad.

Summary
The Poker After Dark format featured an "intimate look at one table as it develops over the week." Blinds start at $100/$200 and slowly escalate. Commentator Ali Nejad's commentary is limited, allowing viewers to hear much of the table talk among the players, all of whom are mic'ed. (The table talk occasionally reveals that the "week-long" series is taped in one long session.)

The series was originally structured as a series of week-long No Limit Texas hold 'em mini-tournaments for six top poker professionals. Each week the players vied for a $120,000 winner-takes-all prize pool, with each paying a $20,000 buy-in. By the end of the fifth show, a winner is determined. The sixth show was a "director's cut" that includes excerpts from the action from the previous five days, interspersed with talking heads commentary from the participants. Beginning with Season 4, the producers began to experiment with different formats, including no-limit cash games, and a double-elimination Heads Up battle between the first 4 winners of the National Heads-Up Poker Championship.  Also, Seasons 3, 4 and 5 had a "Dream Table," pitting an amateur against five pros.

Broadcast
Poker After Dark aired six times a week, at 2:05 a.m. ET (1:05 CT) Tuesday through Saturday, and then at 1:00 a.m. ET (12:00 CT) on Sundays, though times vary according to the preferences of the affiliates. The early Sunday show is a "director's cut" weekly summary of the previous week's shows.

Several NBC affiliates, most notably those owned by Post-Newsweek Stations, Barrington Broadcasting, some Raycom Media stations, WBBH-TV in Fort Myers, Florida, and the LDS Church-owned KSL-TV in Salt Lake City refused to air the show due to management or locality objections against programs featuring gambling (the Post-Newsweek stations also refused to carry Face the Ace in August 2009), while other stations did not carry it due to existing syndication contracts precluding it from airing the series or to retain control of their overnight schedules. It was not aired entirely in the state of Texas due to the state's strict gambling laws.

NBC abruptly stopped airing Poker After Dark on September 23, 2011, a few days after Preet Bharara, the U.S. Attorney for the Southern District of New York, issued a statement alleging production underwriter Full Tilt Poker had perpetrated a Ponzi scheme on its customers. Replacing the show was a rebroadcast of the Hoda Kotb/Kathie Lee Gifford-hosted fourth hour of Today, and on the weekends, a second episode of In Wine Country from San Francisco Bay Area NBC station KNTV. NBC Sports has since removed their poker section entirely from their webpage, and previous episodes have been removed from Hulu. Although NBC did not issue a definitive statement regarding the schedule change or the future of the show, NBC Sports Senior Director of Communications Adam Freifeld has stated that NBC will "continue to evaluate our poker programming."

Since 2017, Poker After Dark has aired live each month exclusively on PokerGO. Full replays and highlight recaps are also available on demand for each episode.

International

In Canada Poker After Dark aired afternoons and late nights on Rogers Sportsnet and, since fall 2009 on the French network V.

In France Poker After Dark airs at night on RTL9.  In Germany, it airs on SPORT1, with commentary provided by Michael Körner.  In Ireland, Poker After Dark airs on Setanta Ireland and Setanta Sports 1 on most weeknights with little change from the US version.  In The Netherlands, it airs on Veronica; episodes feature the original English commentary with Dutch subtitles. In Sweden, Poker After Dark airs on afternoons and nights on TV4 Sport and on TV 10 weekday nights at 01:30. In Denmark, it airs at night on TV3+.  In Italy, Poker After Dark airs at night on POKERItalia24. In Poland, Poker After Dark airs during evenings on Sportklub and Sport Klub+; commentary is provided by Paweł Majewski and Marcin Grzywacz..  In Russia, the show airs on 7TV at 11:30pm every day until the Febral, and now shows on REN-TV at 3:00 pm.

Episodes

Season 1 (2007) 
Season 1 was taped at the South Point Casino in Las Vegas, Nevada.

 Jennifer Harman was the only player to reach the final two players more than once.
 Doyle Brunson, Phil Hellmuth, Mike Matusow, and Jennifer Harman appeared in the most weeks for the season with three appearances each.

Season 2 (2007)
Season 2 was taped in May 2007 at the South Point Casino in Las Vegas.

Week 8 (Mega Match) required a $50,000 buy-in rather than the usual $20,000, resulting in a $300,000 first prize.
Week 10 (Show Open) was so named because the participants were those featured in the show's 2007 opening credits.
Howard Lederer was the only player to reach the final two players more than once.
Daniel Negreanu, Phil Hellmuth, Gus Hansen, and Howard Lederer appeared in the most weeks for the season with three appearances each.

Season 3 (2008)
Season 3 was taped in October 2007 at the South Point Casino in Las Vegas.

Week 1 (Dream Table) featured the winner of a Full Tilt Poker sponsored contest (Ken Light) and was billed as the five professionals Light chose to play against, though Light said in an interview during one of the week's episodes that he was only asked to list his favorite players, and did not know that the list would be used to form the table.
Week 9 (Love at First Raise) featured three pairs of players who were couples at the time of filming: Jennifer Harman & Marco Traniello, David Benyamine & Erica Schoenberg, and Jennifer Tilly & Phil Laak.
Phil Hellmuth reached the final two players three times, and Johnny Chan reached the final two players two times.
Phil Hellmuth and Johnny Chan each won two sit-n-goes.
Daniel Negreanu, Phil Hellmuth, and Mike Matusow appeared in the most weeks for the season with three appearances each.

Season 4 (2008)
Season 4 was taped in April 2008 at the South Point Casino in Las Vegas.  Season 4 episode titles and presumed seating order taken from NBC's Web site.

Season 4 was the first time cash games were filmed.
The two weeks of cash games were a $200/400 no-limit game instead of a winner take all tournament. During most of the second cash game, the players agreed to $100 antes and the occasional $800 straddle.
Week 3 (Heads-Up Challenge) was a double elimination heads-up format featuring the first four winners of the National Heads-Up Poker Championship and required a $50,000 buy-in resulting in a winner-take-all $200,000 prize.
Week 4 (Mission Impossible) was named in reference to Mike Matusow, who entered the game winless in three-plus seasons of the show, while each of his opponents had won at least once.
Week 5 (Dream II) was the second tournament consisting of the winner of a Full Tilt Poker sponsored contest (Paul Featherstone) and the five professionals he chose to play against.
Phil Hellmuth appeared in the most weeks for the season with five appearances, while Mike Matusow appeared in three weeks.

Season 5 (2009)
Most of Season 5 was taped December 19–21, 2008 at the Golden Nugget Las Vegas. The season's first three weeks include episodes originally announced as Season 4 episodes and were taped at South Point.

Season 5 would see the first relocation of Poker After Dark as it moved from South Point Casino to the Golden Nugget Las Vegas.
Season 5 was the first season with more cash game weeks then sit-n-go weeks.
Close but no Cigar Week consisted of players who at the time of taping had played at a WSOP Main Event final table but did not win.
Mike Matusow is the only pro to participate in all three Dream Table games.
The two weeks of Hellmuth Bash games were the first time the same six players appeared over 10 consecutive episodes of play.
Celebrities and Mentors week was completed in four episodes. The director's cut was aired as the fifth episode, and a "Best Of" look back at Seasons 1-5 was aired at the usual time for the director's cut.
 Eli Elezra has only played in cash games or during weeks when the final prize was larger than the normal $120,000. Until this season, he always occupied Seat 6 when appearing.
 Magnificent Six featured five of the six players shown in this season's opening credits.
 Gus Hansen's participation in the Railbird Heaven Cash Game was his first appearance since Season 3.
Tom Dwan appeared in the most weeks for the season with six appearances, while Phil Hellmuth and Phil Ivey appeared in five weeks each.

Season 6 (2010) 
Season 6 was taped in October 2009 at the Golden Nugget Las Vegas and is scheduled to have 13 weeks of episodes.

 New graphics debuted with Season 6, including a notation of which player has the button. Previous seasons sometimes used a non-standard "first to act" graphic. Percentages to win the hand are shown more frequently than in past seasons, especially pre-flop, and a trailing player's outs are shown during all-in situations.
 Week 12 (Cash Game 150k, Part 2) - Phil Laak fills in for Alan Meltzer after Alan leaves mid-session.
Phil Hellmuth appeared in the most weeks for the season with six appearances, while Mike Matusow appeared in five weeks.

Season 7 (2011) 
Season 7 took place from the Aria Resort & Casino in Las Vegas, and was scheduled for 13 weeks of new episodes. The program was pulled from the schedule during this season after episode 48, and as a consequence weeks 9-13 never aired on NBC but are available on PokerGO.

 Season 7 would see the second relocation of Poker After Dark as it moved from the Golden Nugget Las Vegas to Aria Resort & Casino.
 Previous to Season 7, the biggest buy-in sit-n-go was the $50,000 buy-in Week 8 (Mega Match) won by Allen Cunningham. In Season 7 there was both a $50,000 buy-in and a $100,000 buy-in sit-n-go won by Tom Dwan and Huck Seed respectively.
Tom Dwan appeared in the most weeks for the season with six appearances, while Phil Hellmuth and Phil Ivey appeared in five weeks each.

Season 8 (2017)
Season 8 took place from inside the PokerGO Studio at ARIA Resort and Casino. Unlike the previous seven seasons, Season 8 would follow a new format of broadcasting live streams of each day of play, along with providing daily recaps of the action exclusively on PokerGO. 

 Season 8 followed a new format for Poker After Dark of live-streaming the action on delay on PokerGO.
 Week 10 (Holidays with Hellmuth) would have two sit-n-goes that didn't have a winner-take-all format for the first time on Poker After Dark as both first and second places were paid.
 Matt Berkey appeared in the most weeks for the season with nine appearances, while Brian Rast and Daniel Cates appeared in eight nights each.

Season 9 (2018) 
Season 9 was filmed inside the PokerGO Studio at ARIA Resort and Casino. Each day of play was live streamed exclusively on PokerGO and would be available on demand, along with daily recaps of the action.

 Season 9 would feature the most weeks in a season of Poker After Dark with 21. The most before that was 13 weeks in Seasons 5–7.
In September 2020, PokerGO launched Poker After Dark Studio Cuts which would see live streams cut into episodes. Power Play was one of the shows cut into Studio Cuts with each night of play split into three episodes each.
 Week 9 (Open House) was the first time Poker After Dark would be filmed inside the PokerGO Studio.
Season 9 would be the first time a game other than No-Limit Hold'em or Pot-Limit Omaha was played. Week 14 (Big Three) featured a three-game rotation of No-Limit Hold'em, Pot-Limit Omaha, and No-Limit 2-7 Single Draw. Week 16 (Godfather) was a H.O.R.S.E. and 2-7 Triple Draw rotation. Week 19 (Dolly's Game) was No-Limit 2-7 Single Draw. Week 21 (Pro Bono) was Short Deck.
 Week 17 (888poker Week) was a $10,000 buy-in sit-n-go. Day 1 was won by Maria Ho, and Day 2 was won by Eli Elezra.
 Bob Bright appeared on 11 shows, ahead of Antonio Esfandiari and Randall Emmett on nine each, and Ben Lamb and Jennifer Tilly on eight each.

Season 10 (2019) 
Season 10 was filmed inside the PokerGO Studio at ARIA Resort and Casino. Each day of play was live-streamed exclusively on PokerGO and would be available on-demand, along with daily recaps of the action.

 Season 10 would be the first season of Poker After Dark filmed entirely in the PokerGO Studio at ARIA Resort & Casino.
In September 2020, PokerGO launched Poker After Dark Studio Cuts which would see live streams cut into episodes. GOAT week was one of the shows cut into Studio Cuts with each night of play split into three episodes each.
 Week 5 (888poker Week II) was a $10,000 buy-in sit-n-go. Day 1 was won by Ali Imsirovic, and Day 2 was won by Chris Moorman.
 Week 11 (Showbound!) was a $5,000 buy-in sit-n-go. Day 1 was won by Maria Ho, and Day 2 was won by Garry Gates.
Week 12 (Whales vs. Wizards) included a $5,000 buy-in sit-n-go with one rebuy allowed. Justin Young was the winner.
Randall Emmett appeared on 11 shows, ahead of Brandon Cantu on eight, and Phil Hellmuth on seven.

Season 11 (2020)
Season 11 was filmed inside the PokerGO Studio at ARIA Resort & Casino. Each day of play was live-streamed exclusively on PokerGO and would be available on-demand, along with daily recaps of the action. Season 11 was cut short due to the COVID-19 pandemic and only featured two weeks of play.

 In September 2020, PokerGO launched Poker After Dark Studio Cuts which would see live streams cut into episodes. One Night in Vegas was one of the shows cut into Studio Cuts with the lone night of play split into two episodes.
 Antonio Esfandiari, David Silverman, Evan Mathis, and Jennifer Tilly each appeared on two shows each.

Season 12 (2020-21)
Season 12 was filmed inside the PokerGO Studio at ARIA Resort & Casino. After each day of play being live-streamed on PokerGO for seasons 8 to 11, Poker After Dark returned to an episodic format released weekly for Season 12.

 Season 12 of Poker After Dark returned to an episodic format that aired on Sunday evenings for Week 1 (Cry Me a River), before switching to Monday evenings for Week 2 (The Bratty Bunch) onwards.
Veronica Brill was introduced as the sideline reporter for Season 12.
Week 5 (Lesson Learned) was a $5,000 buy-in sit-n-go. James Romero defeated Matt Affleck and won $30,000.
Alex Ding and Jake Daniels both appeared in three weeks each.

Season 13 (2021)
Season 13 was filmed inside the PokerGO Studio at ARIA Resort & Casino. Episodes were released weekly on Mondays for Season 13.

 Veronica Brill continued as the sideline reporter for Season 13.
Week 4 (Fight Night) was a $10,000 buy-in sit-n-go. Nick Wright defeated Phil Hellmuth and won $50,000.

Results and notes
Results from cash game weeks, which Poker After Dark introduced in Season 4 and continued in Season 5, Season 6, and Season 7, are also omitted.

Season 1 (2007)

In the third episode of Week 1, the players continued to talk and make noise while Phil Hellmuth was trying to decide whether to go all-in against Annie Duke. Hellmuth held , while Duke had . The lack of decorum caused Hellmuth to lash out at Shawn Sheikhan, call over the show's executive producer, and leave the table. Hellmuth also threatened not to participate in future Poker After Dark tournaments unless the show implemented a rule that encouraged people to stop talking when a player is making an important decision. Immediately after the incident, producers put in place a rule which states that if a player wishes to have silence at the table when faced with a tough decision, the player need only inform the dealer, who will then notify the other players of the request. Failure to comply will result in a "time-out" period of one lap of the button for the offending player(s), with blinds forfeited during this time.

Season 2 (2007)

In "International" week, Gus Hansen was knocked out after six hands, and heads-up play started after 53 hands, both record lows for the show.

Season 3 (2008)

"Dream Table" week featured a Poker After Dark first: Phil Hellmuth won by calling an all-in bet from both Ken Light and Jen Harman on the last hand, resulting in the first match to end with no heads-up play.
"Hecklers Week" featured a controversial situation which necessitated the producer having to come to the table. Phil Hellmuth attempted to bluff the river with pair of aces on the board in a hand against Jean-Robert Bellande, and Bellande called. Hellmuth then said "you got it" and held onto his cards, waiting for Bellande to show the winner. Bellande felt he did not have to show his hand, while Hellmuth thought "olden day etiquette" indicated that he should. The tournament was stopped for 5 minutes while all players voiced their opinions and eventually the producer came over and then Hellmuth showed his hand, necessitating that Bellande show his to claim the pot.
"Jam Up" week featured a rule that allowed any player knocked out over the first six hands (once around the table) to rebuy. On the first hand, Eli Elezra was knocked out when his AK didn't crack Howard Lederer's AA when they both got all their chips in pre-flop. Eli was allowed to rebuy for another $20,000, which brought the total chips in play to $140,000, and the first place prize to $140,000.
The "Best Of" episode that closed Season 5 featured Elezra's knockout on the first hand of Jam Up week, but did not make clear that he was able to rebuy after busting out on the first hand per that week's rules, and insinuated he was eliminated.

Season 4 (2008)
Weeks 1 and 7 were Cash Games #1 and #2, and are omitted from the results table.

The Heads Up Challenge used a double-elimination format. In the opening round, Chris Ferguson defeated Paul Wasicka and Phil Hellmuth defeated Ted Forrest. Hellmuth then defeated Ferguson to move on to the final, while Forrest's win against Wasicka eliminated Wasicka. Facing off with one loss each, Ferguson defeated Forrest to set up a Hellmuth-Ferguson final, where Hellmuth only needed to win one out of two matches while Ferguson needed to sweep both matches. Ferguson won the opener before Hellmuth won the finale. In each of Hellmuth's wins against Ferguson, he had pocket tens on the final hand.

Season 5 (2009)
Seven of the 16 weeks during season 5—Weeks 4, 7, 8, 11, 12, 15, 16—were cash games, and are omitted from the results table.

 Season 5 started with three veteran Poker After Dark players securing their first PAD wins (Matusow, Gordon and Bloch).
 In Celebrities and Mentors, the mentor-celebrity relationships were Greenstein-Alexander, Smith-Hershiser and Gordon-Cheadle.
 Chris Ferguson had lost six times, including the Season 4 Heads-Up Challenge, before his Magnificent Six win became his first win since Season 1.
 Howard Lederer became the first player to place last one week, and win the next week.

Season 6 (2010)
Six of the 13 weeks during season 6—Weeks 3, 4, 7, 8, 11, and 12—were cash games, and are omitted from the results table.

Gabe Kaplan's win in Commentators III week marked the greatest comeback in Poker After Dark history.
Phil Laak's win in Nicknames week marked the first time a single player has won two Poker After Dark titles against the same opponent heads-up (he won both of his titles against Antonio Esfandiari, the first being in Phil Phil week from Season 1).
The My Favorite Pro tournament marked the first time every episode of play ended in an elimination.

Season 7 (2011) 
As of April 9, 2011, 2 of the 4 weeks aired from season 6 were cash games, and are omitted from the results table. Week 11 wasn't originally aired on NBC, but are now available on PokerGO.

In week 4, Tom Dwan came back from below 40k in chips early to knock out both Andrew Lichtenberger and Melanie Weisner while trailing preflop both times, to finally finish the match against Eric Baldwin, again trailing preflop.

Season 8 (2017) 
Only 3 weeks during Season 8 featured a high stakes sit & go, other episodes featured cash games and are omitted from the results table.

Season 9 (2018) 
Only 1 week during Season 9 featured a high stakes sit & go, other episodes featured cash games and are omitted from the results table.

Season 10 (2019) 
Only 3 weeks during Season 10 featured a high stakes sit & go, other episodes featured cash games and are omitted from the results table.

Season 11 (2020) 
Season 11 was cut short due to the COVID-19 pandemic and only featured two weeks which were both cash games.

Season 12 (2021) 
Only 1 week during Season 12 featured a high stakes sit & go, other episodes featured cash games and are omitted from the results table.

Season 13 (2021) 
Only 1 week during Season 13 featured a high stakes sit & go, other episodes featured cash games and are omitted from the results table.

Reception
In the U.S., the show had some early ratings success: during season one's second week, it attracted on average a larger audience among adults 18-34 than The Late Late Show with Craig Ferguson did the same week, even though the latter is broadcast 90 minutes earlier.

Sponsorship
Full Tilt Poker regularly advertised during Poker After Dark broadcasts, and in some countries, Full Tilt Poker is included in the show's title, which for a time prompted players associated with a rival site (Poker Stars) to stop appearing on the show. Full Tilt Poker held promotional tournaments that offered a seat on the show as the grand prize. The first of these winners, Ken Light, appeared in the first week of Season 3, and was said to have picked his own opponents, though Light later said on the show itself that he was only asked to provide a list of his favorite players and that he did not know that players from the list would join him on the show.

See also
World Series of Poker
National Heads-Up Poker Championship
High Stakes Poker

Notes

References

External links
 
 Poker After Dark at NBCUniversal's Media Village

Full Tilt Poker
NBC original programming
Television shows about poker
Poker in North America
2007 American television series debuts
2011 American television series endings
2000s American television talk shows
2010s American television talk shows
Television shows set in Las Vegas
NBC late-night programming